Enterprise resource planning (ERP) is the integrated management of main business processes, often in real time and mediated by software and technology. ERP is usually referred to as a category of business management software—typically a suite of integrated applications—that an organization can use to collect, store, manage and interpret data from many business activities. ERP systems can be local based or cloud-based. Cloud-based applications have grown in recent years due to information being readily available from any location with Internet access. Traditional on-premises ERP systems are now considered legacy technology.

ERP provides an integrated and continuously updated view of core business processes using common databases maintained by a database management system. ERP systems track business resources—cash, raw materials, production capacity—and the status of business commitments: orders, purchase orders, and payroll. The applications that make up the system share data across various departments (manufacturing, purchasing, sales, accounting, etc.) that provide the data. ERP facilitates information flow between all business functions and manages connections to outside stakeholders.

According to Gartner, the global ERP market size is estimated at $35 billion in 2021. Though early ERP systems focused on large enterprises, smaller enterprises increasingly use ERP systems.

The ERP system integrates varied organizational systems and facilitates error-free transactions and production, thereby enhancing the organization's efficiency. However, developing an ERP system differs from traditional system development.
ERP systems run on a variety of computer hardware and network configurations, typically using a database as an information repository.

Origin
The Gartner Group first used the acronym ERP in the 1990s to include the capabilities of material requirements planning (MRP), and the later manufacturing resource planning (MRP II), as well as computer-integrated manufacturing. Without replacing these terms, ERP came to represent a larger whole that reflected the evolution of application integration beyond manufacturing.

Not all ERP packages are developed from a manufacturing core; ERP vendors variously began assembling their packages with finance-and-accounting, maintenance, and human-resource components. By the mid-1990s ERP systems addressed all core enterprise functions. Governments and non–profit organizations also began to use ERP systems. An "ERP system selection methodology" is a formal process for selecting an enterprise resource planning (ERP) system. Existing methodologies include: Kuiper’s funnel method, Dobrin’s three-dimensional (3D) web-based decision support tool, and the Clarkston Potomac methodology.

Expansion
ERP systems experienced rapid growth in the 1990s. Because of the year 2000 problem many companies took the opportunity to replace their old systems with ERP.

ERP systems initially focused on automating back office functions that did not directly affect customers and the public. Front office functions, such as customer relationship management (CRM), dealt directly with customers, or e-business systems such as e-commerce and e-government—or supplier relationship management (SRM) became integrated later, when the internet simplified communicating with external parties.

"ERP II" was coined in 2000 in an article by Gartner Publications entitled ERP Is Dead—Long Live ERP II. It describes web–based software that provides real–time access to ERP systems to employees and partners (such as suppliers and customers). The ERP II role expands traditional ERP resource optimization and transaction processing. Rather than just manage buying, selling, etc.—ERP II leverages information in the resources under its management to help the enterprise collaborate with other enterprises.
ERP II is more flexible than the first generation ERP. Rather than confine ERP system capabilities within the organization, it goes beyond the corporate walls to interact with other systems. Enterprise application suite is an alternate name for such systems. ERP II systems are typically used to enable collaborative initiatives such as supply chain management (SCM), customer relationship management (CRM) and business intelligence (BI) among business partner organizations through the use of various electronic business technologies. The large proportion of companies are pursuing a strong managerial targets in ERP system instead of acquire a ERP company.

Developers now make more effort to integrate mobile devices with the ERP system. ERP vendors are extending ERP to these devices, along with other business applications, so that businesses don’t have to rely on third-party applications. As an example, the e-commerce platform Shopify was able to make ERP tools from Microsoft and Oracle available on its app in October 2021.

Technical stakes of modern ERP concern integration—hardware, applications, networking, supply chains. ERP now covers more functions and roles—including decision making, stakeholders' relationships, standardization, transparency, globalization, etc.

Characteristics
ERP systems typically include the following characteristics:
 An integrated system
 Operates in (or near) real time
 A common database that supports all the applications
 A consistent look and feel across modules
 Installation of the system with elaborate application/data integration by the Information Technology (IT) department, provided the implementation is not done in small steps
 Deployment options include: on-premises, cloud hosted, or SaaS

Functional areas
An ERP system covers the following common functional areas. In many ERP systems, these are called and grouped together as ERP modules:
 Financial accounting: general ledger, fixed assets, payables including vouchering, matching and payment, receivables and collections, cash management, financial consolidation
 Management accounting: budgeting, costing, cost management, activity based costing
 Human resources: recruiting, training, rostering, payroll, benefits, retirement and pension plans, diversity management, retirement, separation
 Manufacturing: engineering, bill of materials, work orders, scheduling, capacity, workflow management, quality control, manufacturing process, manufacturing projects, manufacturing flow, product life cycle management
 Order processing: order to cash, order entry, credit checking, pricing, available to promise, inventory, shipping, sales analysis and reporting, sales commissioning
 Supply chain management: supply chain planning, supplier scheduling, product configurator, order to cash, purchasing, inventory, claim processing, warehousing (receiving, putaway, picking and packing)
 Project management: project planning, resource planning, project costing, work breakdown structure, billing, time and expense, performance units, activity management
 Customer relationship management (CRM): sales and marketing, commissions, service, customer contact, call center supportCRM systems are not always considered part of ERP systems but rather business support systems (BSS)
 Supplier relationship management (SRM): suppliers, orders, payments.
 Data services: various "self–service" interfaces for customers, suppliers and/or employees
Management of school and educational institutes.

GRP - ERP use in government 
Government resource planning (GRP) is the equivalent of an ERP for the public sector and an integrated office automation system for government bodies. The software structure, modularization, core algorithms and main interfaces do not differ from other ERPs, and ERP software suppliers manage to adapt their systems to government agencies.

Both system implementations, in private and public organizations, are adopted to improve productivity and overall business performance in organizations, but comparisons (private vs. public) of implementations shows that the main factors influencing ERP implementation success in the public sector are cultural.

Best practices
Most ERP systems incorporate best practices. This means the software reflects the vendor's interpretation of the most effective way to perform each business process. Systems vary in how conveniently the customer can modify these practices.

Use of best practices eases compliance with requirements such as IFRS, Sarbanes-Oxley, or Basel II. They can also help comply with de facto industry standards, such as electronic funds transfer. This is because the procedure can be readily codified within the ERP software and replicated with confidence across multiple businesses that share that business requirement.

Connectivity to plant floor information
ERP systems connect to real–time data and transaction data in a variety of ways. These systems are typically configured by systems integrators, who bring unique knowledge on process, equipment, and vendor solutions.

Direct integration—ERP systems have connectivity (communications to plant floor equipment) as part of their product offering. This requires that the vendors offer specific support for the plant floor equipment their customers operate.

Database integration—ERP systems connect to plant floor data sources through staging tables in a database. Plant floor systems deposit the necessary information into the database. The ERP system reads the information in the table. The benefit of staging is that ERP vendors do not need to master the complexities of equipment integration. Connectivity becomes the responsibility of the systems integrator.

Enterprise appliance transaction modules (EATM)—These devices communicate directly with plant floor equipment and with the ERP system via methods supported by the ERP system. EATM can employ a staging table, web services, or system–specific program interfaces (APIs). An EATM offers the benefit of being an off–the–shelf solution.

Custom–integration solutions—Many system integrators offer custom solutions. These systems tend to have the highest level of initial integration cost, and can have a higher long term maintenance and reliability costs. Long term costs can be minimized through careful system testing and thorough documentation. Custom–integrated solutions typically run on workstation or server-class computers.

Implementation
ERP's scope usually implies significant changes to staff work processes and practices. Generally, three types of services are available to help implement such changes: consulting, customization, and support. Implementation time depends on business size, number of modules, customization, the scope of process changes, and the readiness of the customer to take ownership for the project. Modular ERP systems can be implemented in stages. The typical project for a large enterprise takes about 14 months and requires around 150 consultants. Small projects can require months; multinational and other large implementations can take years. Customization can substantially increase implementation times.

Besides that, information processing influences various business functions e.g. some large corporations like Walmart use a just in time inventory system. This reduces inventory storage and increases delivery efficiency, and requires up-to-date data. Before 2014, Walmart used a system called Inforem developed by IBM to manage replenishment.

Process preparation
Implementing ERP typically requires changes in existing business processes. Poor understanding of needed process changes prior to starting implementation is a main reason for project failure. The difficulties could be related to the system, business process, infrastructure, training, or lack of motivation.

It is therefore crucial that organizations thoroughly analyze processes before they deploy an ERP software. Analysis can identify opportunities for process modernization. It also enables an assessment of the alignment of current processes with those provided by the ERP system. Research indicates that risk of business process mismatch is decreased by:
 Linking current processes to the organization's strategy
 Analyzing the effectiveness of each process
 Understanding existing automated solutions

ERP implementation is considerably more difficult (and politically charged) in decentralized organizations, because they often have different processes, business rules, data semantics, authorization hierarchies, and decision centers. This may require migrating some business units before others, delaying implementation to work through the necessary changes for each unit, possibly reducing integration (e.g., linking via master data management) or customizing the system to meet specific needs.

A potential disadvantage is that adopting "standard" processes can lead to a loss of competitive advantage. While this has happened, losses in one area are often offset by gains in other areas, increasing overall competitive advantage.

Configuration
Configuring an ERP system is largely a matter of balancing the way the organization wants the system to work with the way it was designed to work. ERP systems typically include many settings that modify system operations. For example, an organization can select the type of inventory accounting—FIFO or LIFO—to use; whether to recognize revenue by geographical unit, product line, or distribution channel; and whether to pay for shipping costs on customer returns.

Two-tier enterprise resource planning

Two-tier ERP software and hardware lets companies run the equivalent of two ERP systems at once: one at the corporate level and one at the division or subsidiary level. For example, a manufacturing company could use an ERP system to manage across the organization using independent global or regional distribution, production or sales centers, and service providers to support the main company's customers. Each independent center (or) subsidiary may have its own business operations cycles, workflows, and business processes.

Given the realities of globalization, enterprises continuously evaluate how to optimize their regional, divisional, and product or manufacturing strategies to support strategic goals and reduce time-to-market while increasing profitability and delivering value. With two-tier ERP, the regional distribution, production, or sales centers and service providers continue operating under their own business model—separate from the main company, using their own ERP systems. Since these smaller companies' processes and workflows are not tied to main company's processes and workflows, they can respond to local business requirements in multiple locations.

Factors that affect enterprises' adoption of two-tier ERP systems include:
 Manufacturing globalization, the economics of sourcing in emerging economies
 Potential for quicker, less costly ERP implementations at subsidiaries, based on selecting software more suited to smaller companies
 Extra effort, (often involving the use of enterprise application integration) is required where data must pass between two ERP systems Two-tier ERP strategies give enterprises agility in responding to market demands and in aligning IT systems at a corporate level while inevitably resulting in more systems as compared to one ERP system used throughout the organization.

Customization
ERP systems are theoretically based on industry best practices, and their makers intend that organizations deploy them "as is". ERP vendors do offer customers configuration options that let organizations incorporate their own business rules, but gaps in features often remain even after configuration is complete.

ERP customers have several options to reconcile feature gaps, each with their own pros/cons. Technical solutions include rewriting part of the delivered software, writing a homegrown module to work within the ERP system, or interfacing to an external system. These three options constitute varying degrees of system customization—with the first being the most invasive and costly to maintain. Alternatively, there are non-technical options such as changing business practices or organizational policies to better match the delivered ERP feature set. Key differences between customization and configuration include:

 Customization is always optional, whereas the software must always be configured before use (e.g., setting up cost/profit center structures, organizational trees, purchase approval rules, etc.).
 The software is designed to handle various configurations and behaves predictably in any allowed configuration.
 The effect of configuration changes on system behavior and performance is predictable and is the responsibility of the ERP vendor. The effect of customization is less predictable. It is the customer's responsibility, and increases testing requirements.
 Configuration changes survive upgrades to new software versions. Some customizations (e.g., code that uses pre–defined "hooks" that are called before/after displaying data screens) survive upgrades, though they require retesting. Other customizations (e.g., those involving changes to fundamental data structures) are overwritten during upgrades and must be re-implemented.

Advantages of customization include:
Improving user acceptance
Potential to obtain competitive advantage vis-à-vis companies using only standard features.

Customization's disadvantages include that it may:
 Increase time and resources required to implement and maintain
 Hinder seamless interfacing/integration between suppliers and customers due to the differences between systems
 Limit the company's ability to upgrade the ERP software in the future
 Create overreliance on customization, undermining the principles of ERP as a standardizing software platform

Extensions
ERP systems can be extended with third–party software, often via vendor-supplied interfaces. Extensions offer features such as:
 product data management
 product life cycle management
 customer relations management
 data mining
 e-procurement

Data migration
Data migration is the process of moving, copying, and restructuring data from an existing system to the ERP system. Migration is critical to implementation success and requires significant planning. Unfortunately, since migration is one of the final activities before the production phase, it often receives insufficient attention. The following steps can structure migration planning:

 Identify the data to be migrated.
 Determine the migration timing.
 Generate data migration templates for key data components
 Freeze the toolset.
 Decide on the migration-related setup of key business accounts.
 Define data archiving policies and procedures.

Often, data migration is incomplete because some of the data in the existing system is either incompatible or not needed in the new system. As such, the existing system may need to be kept as an archived database to refer back to once the new ERP system is in place.

Advantages
The most fundamental advantage of ERP is that the integration of a myriad of business processes saves time and expense. Management can make decisions faster and with fewer errors. Data becomes visible across the organization. Tasks that benefit from this integration include:
 Sales forecasting, which allows inventory optimization.
 Chronological history of every transaction through relevant data compilation in every area of operation.
 Order tracking, from acceptance through fulfillment
 Revenue tracking, from invoice through cash receipt
 Matching purchase orders (what was ordered), inventory receipts (what arrived), and costing (what the vendor invoiced)

ERP systems centralize business data, which:
 Eliminates the need to synchronize changes between multiple systems—consolidation of finance, marketing, sales, human resource, and manufacturing applications
 Brings legitimacy and transparency to each bit of statistical data
 Facilitates standard product naming/coding
 Provides a comprehensive enterprise view (no "islands of information"), making real–time information available to management anywhere, anytime to make proper decisions
 Protects sensitive data by consolidating multiple security systems into a single structure

Benefits
 ERP creates a more agile company that adapts better to change. It also makes a company more flexible and less rigidly structured so organization components operate more cohesively, enhancing the business—internally and externally.
 ERP can improve data security in a closed environment. A common control system, such as the kind offered by ERP systems, allows organizations the ability to more easily ensure key company data is not compromised. This changes, however, with a more open environment, requiring further scrutiny of ERP security features and internal company policies regarding security.
 ERP provides increased opportunities for collaboration. Data takes many forms in the modern enterprise, including documents, files, forms, audio and video, and emails. Often, each data medium has its own mechanism for allowing collaboration. ERP provides a collaborative platform that lets employees spend more time collaborating on content rather than mastering the learning curve of communicating in various formats across distributed systems.
ERP offers many benefits such as standardization of common processes, one integrated system, standardized reporting, improved key performance indicators (KPI), and access to common data. One of the key benefits of ERP; the concept of integrated system, is often misinterpreted by the business. ERP is a centralized system that provides tight integration with all major enterprise functions be it HR, planning, procurement, sales, customer relations, finance or analytics, as well to other connected application functions. In that sense ERP could be described as a centralized integrated enterprise system (CIES)

Disadvantages
 Customization can be problematic. Compared to the best-of-breed approach, ERP can be seen as meeting an organization's lowest common denominator needs, forcing the organization to find workarounds to meet unique demands.
 Re-engineering business processes to fit the ERP system may damage competitiveness or divert focus from other critical activities.
 ERP can cost more than less integrated or less comprehensive solutions.
 High ERP switching costs can increase the ERP vendor's negotiating power, which can increase support, maintenance, and upgrade expenses.
 Overcoming resistance to sharing sensitive information between departments can divert management attention.
 Integration of truly independent businesses can create unnecessary dependencies.
 Extensive training requirements take resources from daily operations.
 Harmonization of ERP systems can be a mammoth task (especially for big companies) and requires a lot of time, planning, and money.
Critical challenges include disbanding the project team very quickly after implementation, interface issues, lack of proper testing, time zone limitations, stress, offshoring, people's resistance to change, a short hyper-care period, and data cleansing.

Critical success factors 
Critical success factors are limited number of areas in which results, if satisfactory, will ensure the organization’s successful competitive performance. The CSF method has helped organizations specify their own critical information needs. Achieving satisfactory results in the key areas of critical success factors can ensure competitive advantage leading to improved organizational performance and overcome the challenges faced by organizations. Critical success factors theoretical foundation was improved upon, verified, and validated by several researchers, which underscored the importance of CSFs and its application to ERP project implementations.

The application of critical success factors can prevent organizations from making costly mistakes, and the effective usage of CSFs can ensure project success and reduce failures during project implementations. Some of the important critical success factors related to ERP projects are: Know your data, longer and more integrated testing, utilization of the right people, longer stabilization period (hyper-care), clear communication, early buy-in from business, have a Lean Agile program, less customization, ERP projects must be business-driven and not IT-driven.

Adoption rates
Research published in 2011 based on a survey of 225 manufacturers, retailers and distributors found "high" rates of interest and adoption of ERP systems and that very few businesses were "completely untouched" by the concept of an ERP system. 27% of the companies survey had a fully operational system, 12% were at that time rolling out a system and 26% had an existing ERP system which they were extending or upgrading.

Postmodern ERP 
The term "postmodern ERP" was coined by Gartner in 2013, when it first appeared in the paper series "Predicts 2014". According to Gartner's definition of the postmodern ERP strategy, legacy, monolithic and highly customized ERP suites, in which all parts are heavily reliant on each other, should sooner or later be replaced by a mixture of both cloud-based and on-premises applications, which are more loosely coupled and can be easily exchanged if needed.

The basic idea is that there should still be a core ERP solution that would cover most important business functions, while other functions will be covered by specialist software solutions that merely extend the core ERP. This concept is similar to the so-called best-of-breed approach to software execution, but it shouldn't be confused with it. While in both cases, applications that make up the whole are relatively loosely connected and quite easily interchangeable, in the case of the latter there is no ERP solution whatsoever. Instead, every business function is covered by a separate software solution.

There is, however, no golden rule as to what business functions should be part of the core ERP, and what should be covered by supplementary solutions. According to Gartner, every company must define their own postmodern ERP strategy, based on company's internal and external needs, operations and processes. For example, a company may define that the core ERP solution should cover those business processes that must stay behind the firewall, and therefore, choose to leave their core ERP on-premises. At the same time, another company may decide to host the core ERP solution in the cloud and move only a few ERP modules as supplementary solutions to on-premises.

The main benefits that companies will gain from implementing postmodern ERP strategy are speed and flexibility when reacting to unexpected changes in business processes or on the organizational level. With the majority of applications having a relatively loose connection, it is fairly easy to replace or upgrade them whenever necessary. In addition to that, following the examples above, companies can select and combine cloud-based and on-premises solutions that are most suited for their ERP needs. The downside of postmodern ERP is that it will most likely lead to an increased number of software vendors that companies will have to manage, as well as pose additional integration challenges for the central IT.

See also
 List of ERP software packages
 Business process management
 Comparison of project management software

References

Bibliography
  

Henderson, Ian ERP from the Frontline MBE   Making ERP Work

 
 
  
 
 

 
  
 
 
 Ram, Jiwat, and David Corkindale. “Developing a Framework for the Management of Critical Success Factors in Organisational Innovation Projects: A Case of Enterprise Resource Planning Systems.” Integrating Innovation: South Australian Entrepreneurship Systems and Strategies, edited by Göran Roos and Allan O’Connor, University of Adelaide Press, 2015, pp. 327–54, .
 Riposo, Jessie, Guy Weichenberg, Chelsea Kaihoi Duran, Bernard Fox, William Shelton, and Andreas Thorsen. “Organizational Change Management.” In Improving Air Force Enterprise Resource Planning-Enabled Business Transformation, 23–28. RAND Corporation, 2013. .
 Aronin, B. S., Bailey, J. W., Byun, J. S., Davis, G. A., Wolfe, C. L., Frazier, T. P., & Bronson, P. F. (2018). ERP Systems in the DoD. In Global Combat Support System – Marine Corps: Root Cause Analysis (pp. 7–18). Institute for Defense Analyses. .
 Ragowsky, Arik, and Toni M. Somers. “Special Section: Enterprise Resource Planning.” Journal of Management Information Systems, vol. 19, no. 1, Taylor & Francis, Ltd., 2002, pp. 11–15, .
 LIEDTKA, JEANNE, ANDREW KING, and KEVIN BENNETT. “Rethinking Strategic Planning at SAP.” In Solving Problems with Design Thinking: Ten Stories of What Works, 74–91. Columbia University Press, 2013. .
 Morris, Michael G., and Viswanath Venkatesh. “Job Characteristics and Job Satisfaction: Understanding the Role of Enterprise Resource Planning System Implementation.” MIS Quarterly, vol. 34, no. 1, Management Information Systems Research Center, University of Minnesota, 2010, pp. 143–61, .
 Tsai, Bi-Huei, and Shin-Bin Chou. “APPLICATION OF MULTIPLE OUTPUT DATA ENVELOPMENT ANALYSIS IN INTERPRETING EFFICIENCY IMPROVEMENT OF ENTERPRISE RESOURCE PLANNING IN INTEGRATED CIRCUIT FIRMS.” The Journal of Developing Areas, vol. 49, no. 1, College of Business, Tennessee State University, 2015, pp. 285–304, .
 van Merode GG, Groothuis S, Hasman A. Enterprise resource planning for hospitals. Int J Med Inform. 2004 Jun 30;73(6):493-501. . .
 Zerbino P, Aloini D, Dulmin R, Mininno V. Why enterprise resource planning initiatives do succeed in the long run: A case-based causal network. PLoS One. 2021 Dec 16;16(12):e0260798. . ; .
 Lee CW, Kwak NK. Strategic enterprise resource planning in a health-care system using a multicriteria decision-making model. J Med Syst. 2011 Apr;35(2):265-75. . Epub 2009 Sep 10. .
 Grove S. Enterprise resource planning: case history. Optimizing the supply chain. Health Manag Technol. 2004 Jan;25(1):24-7. .
 Schuerenberg BK. Making connections across an enterprise. Enterprise resource planning systems are tough to implement, but can provide a big payback. Health Data Manag. 2003 Jun;11(6):72-4, 76, 78. .
 Tian, Feng, and Sean Xin Xu. “How Do Enterprise Resource Planning Systems Affect Firm Risk? Post-Implementation Impact.” MIS Quarterly, vol. 39, no. 1, Management Information Systems Research Center, University of Minnesota, 2015, pp. 39–60, .
 Ferratt, Thomas W., et al. “Achieving Success in Large Projects: Implications from a Study of ERP Implementations.” Interfaces, vol. 36, no. 5, INFORMS, 2006, pp. 458–69, .
 Karimi, Jahangir, Toni M. Somers, and Anol Bhattacherjee. “The Impact of ERP Implementation on Business Process Outcomes: A Factor-Based Study.” Journal of Management Information Systems 24, no. 1 (2007): 101–34. .
 Ranganathan, C., and Carol V. Brown. “ERP Investments and the Market Value of Firms: Toward an Understanding of Influential ERP Project Variables.” Information Systems Research, vol. 17, no. 2, INFORMS, 2006, pp. 145–61, .
 Benco, Daniel C., and Larry Prather. “Market Reaction to Announcements to Invest in ERP Systems.” Quarterly Journal of Finance and Accounting, vol. 47, no. 4, University of Nebraska-Lincoln College of Business Administration, 2008, pp. 145–69, .
 Stephenson, Stephen V., and Andrew P. Sage. "Information and knowledge perspectives in systems engineering and management for innovation and productivity through enterprise resource planning." Information Resources Management Journal 20, no. 2 (2007): 44+. Gale Academic OneFile (accessed January 26, 2022). . 
 McGaughey, Ronald E., and Angappa Gunasekaran. "Enterprise Resource Planning (ERP): past, present and future." International Journal of Enterprise Information Systems 3, no. 3 (2007): 23+. Gale Academic OneFile (accessed January 26, 2022). .
 Cordova, Ronald S., Rolou Lyn R. Maata, Ferdinand J. Epoc, and Marwan Alshar'e. "Challenges and Opportunities of Using Blockchain in Supply Chain Management." Global Business and Management Research: An International Journal 13, no. 3 (2021): 204+. Gale Academic OneFile (accessed January 26, 2022). . 
 Muscatello, Joseph R., and Injazz J. Chen. "Enterprise resource planning (ERP) implementations: theory and practice." International Journal of Enterprise Information Systems 4, no. 1 (2008): 63+. Gale Academic OneFile (accessed January 26, 2022). .  
 Muscatello, Joseph R., and Diane H. Parente. "Enterprise resource planning (ERP): a postimplementation cross-case analysis." Information Resources Management Journal 19, no. 3 (2006): 61+. Gale Academic OneFile (accessed January 26, 2022). . 
 Farzaneh, Mandana, Iman Raeesi Vanani, and Babak Sohrabi. "A survey study of influential factors in the implementation of enterprise resource planning systems." International Journal of Enterprise Information Systems 9, no. 1 (2013): 76+. Gale Academic OneFile (accessed January 26, 2022). . 
 AlMuhayfith, Sara, and Hani Shaiti. "The Impact of Enterprise Resource Planning on Business Performance: With the Discussion on Its Relationship with Open Innovation." Journal of Open Innovation: Technology, Market, and Complexity 6, no. 3 (2020). Gale Academic OneFile (accessed January 26, 2022). . 
  
 
  
  
  
 
  
  
   
 Wenrich, Kristi I., and Norita Ahmad. "Lessons learned during a decade of ERP experience: a case study." International Journal of Enterprise Information Systems 5, no. 1 (2009): 55+. Gale Academic OneFile (accessed January 26, 2022). . 
 Subramanian, Girish H., and Christopher S. Hoffer. "An exploratory case study of enterprise resource planning implementation." International Journal of Enterprise Information Systems 1, no. 1 (2005): 23+. Gale Academic OneFile (accessed January 26, 2022). . 
 W. Yang, H. Liu and J. Shi, "The design of printing enterprise resources planning (ERP) software," 2010 2nd IEEE International Conference on Information Management and Engineering, 2010, pp. 151–154, .
 Cronan, Timothy Paul, and David E. Douglas. "Assessing ERP learning (management, business process, and skills) and attitudes." Journal of Organizational and End User Computing, April–June 2013, 59+. Gale Academic OneFile (accessed January 26, 2022). . 
 Hayes, David C., James E. Hunton, and Jacqueline L. Reck. "Market Reaction to ERP Implementation Announcements." Journal of Information Systems 15, no. 1 (2001): 3. Gale Academic OneFile (accessed January 26, 2022). . 
 Alves, Maria do Ceu, and Sergio Ivo Amaral Matos. "ERP adoption by public and private organizations--a comparative analysis of successful implementations." Journal of Business Economics and Management 14, no. 3 (2013): 500. Gale Academic OneFile (accessed January 26, 2022). .
 Elsayed, N., Ammar, S., and Mardini, G. H., “The impact of ERP utilisation experience and segmental reporting on corporate performance in the UK context”, Enterprise Information Systems, vol. 15, no. 1, pp. 61–86, 2021. . .
 Sutduean, J., Singsa, A., Sriyakul, T., and Jermsittiparsert, K., “Supply Chain Integration, Enterprise Resource Planning, and Organizational Performance: The Enterprise Resource Planning Implementation Approach”, Journal of Computational and Theoretical Nanoscience, vol. 16, no. 7, pp. 2975–2981, 2019. . .  
 Alfaris, M. F., Edikuncoro, G. Y., Savitri, A. L., Yogiari, D., and Sulistio, J., “A Literature Review of Sustain Enterprise Resource Planning”, in Materials Science and Engineering Conference Series, 2019, vol. 598, no. 1, p. 012128. . .  
 G. Chattopadhyay, "Development of a learning package for interactive learning in enterprise resources planning (ERP)," 2004 IEEE International Engineering Management Conference (IEEE Cat. No.04CH37574), 2004, pp. 848–850 Vol.2, .
 D. Reuther and G. Chattopadhyay, "Critical factors for enterprise resources planning system selection and implementation projects within small to medium enterprises," 2004 IEEE International Engineering Management Conference (IEEE Cat. No.04CH37574), 2004, pp. 851–855 Vol.2, .
 Lv, T., Zhang, J., and Chen, Y., “Research of ERP Platform based on Cloud Computing”, in Materials Science and Engineering Conference Series, 2018, vol. 394, no. 4, p. 042004. . . 
 Hasan, N., Miah, S. J., Bao, Y., and Hoque, M. R., “Factors affecting post-implementation success of enterprise resource planning systems: a perspective of business process performance”, Enterprise Information Systems, vol. 13, no. 9, pp. 1217–1244, 2019. . .  
 
 
 
 
     
 Sardjono, W., Sudirwan, J., Priatna, W., and Putra, G. R., “Application of factor analysis method to support the users acceptance model of ERP systems implementation”, in Journal of Physics: Conference Series, 2021, vol. 1836, no. 1. . . 
 Meiryani, Erick Fernando, Setiani Putri Hendratno, Kriswanto, and Septi Wifasari. 2021. Enterprise Resource Planning Systems: The Business Backbone. 2021 The 5th International Conference on E-Commerce, E-Business and E-Government. Association for Computing Machinery, New York, NY, USA, 43–48.   
 T. Yang, J. Choi, Z. Xi, Y. Sun, C. Ouyang and Y. Huang, "Research of Enterprise Resource Planning in a Specific Enterprise," 2006 IEEE International Conference on Systems, Man and Cybernetics, 2006, pp. 418–422, .
 Komala, A. R. and Gunanda, I., “Development of Enterprise Resource Planning using Blockchain”, in Materials Science and Engineering Conference Series, 2020, vol. 879, no. 1, p. 012141. . . 
 Tsai, W.-H., Lee, K.-C., Liu, J.-Y., Lin, S.-J., and Chou, Y.-W., “The influence of enterprise resource planning (ERP) systems' performance on earnings management”, Enterprise Information Systems, vol. 6, no. 4, pp. 491–517, 2012. . .
 Kapulin, D. V., Russkikh, P. A., and Moor, I. A., “Integration capabilities of business process models and ERP-systems”, in Journal of Physics: Conference Series, 2019, vol. 1333, no. 7. . . 
 Sebayang, P., Tarigan, Z. J. H., and Panjaitan, T. W. S., “ERP compatibility on business performance through the inventory system and internal integration”, in Materials Science and Engineering Conference Series, 2021, vol. 1010, no. 1, p. 012008. . .  
 August-Wilhelm Scheer and Frank Habermann. 2000. Enterprise resource planning: making ERP a success. Communications of the ACM 43, 4 (April 2000), 57–61.  
 Kuldeep Kumar and Jos van Hillegersberg. 2000. Enterprise resource planning: introduction. Communications of the ACM 43, 4 (April 2000), 22–26.

External links
 
 
 

ERP software
Computer-related introductions in 1990
Computer-aided engineering
Computer occupations
Computational fields of study
Enterprise resource planning terminology
Office and administrative support occupations
Automation
Automation software
Business models
Business terms
Production planning
Business planning
Business process
Customer relationship management
Financial management
Human resource management
Supply chain management
Product lifecycle management
20th-century inventions
Management cybernetics